John Evangelist Stadler (December 24, 1804 in Parkstetten, in the Diocese of Regensburg – December 30, 1868 in Augsburg) was a Bavarian hagiographer.

After completing the humanities in the Gymnasium of Straubing in 1821, he entered the University of Landshut, where, in addition to the philosophical and theological studies prescribed for candidates to the priesthood, he devoted much of his time to the study of Middle Eastern and modern languages. The year preceding his ordination to the priesthood he spent at the diocesan seminary of Ratisbon, where under the direction of Michael Wittmann, the future auxiliary Bishop of Ratisbon, he prepared himself for the priesthood. After being ordained priest by Bishop Joseph Michael Sailer at Ratisbon 22 June 1827, he was occupied a few months in parochial work at the little village of Otzing in lower Bavaria, whereupon he continued his theological studies at the Ducal Georgianum in Munich in November, 1828, and obtained the doctorate in Theology in 1829.

In 1830 he was "co-operator" at the Hospital of the Holy Ghost in Munich, in 1831 Privatdocent for Old Testament exegesis at the University of Munich, and in 1832 he succeeded Pruggmeyr as subregens of the Georgianum. In addition he was in 1833 appointed professor-extraordinary and in 1837 professor-ordinary of exegesis at the university. In 1838 he became canon and in 1858 dean at the Cathedral of Augsburg. Stadler was well versed in all the branches of theology, but he was especially fond of linguistic studies. Besides having a mastery of German, French, Italian, and English among the modern languages, he knew Latin, Greek, Hebrew, Syriac, Arabian, Persian, Sanskrit, and in his later years he studied also Spanish and Polish.

He was best known as the author of Vollständiges Heiligen-Lexikon oder Lebensgeschichten aller Heiligen, Seligen u.a. aller Orte und aller Jahrhunderte, deren Andenken in der kath. Kirche gefeiert oder sonst geehrt wird (Augsburg, 1858–82), an alphabetical collection of lives of Catholic saints from all over the world and from many different eras. The Acta Sanctorum of the Bollandists, as far as they were finished, that is, to the end of October, were condensed into short sketches, but many new lives were introduced and newly discovered data were added to the lives contained in the Acta.  In the preparation of the first volume Stadler was assisted by Rev. Fr. J. Heim, while the second and the third volume contain contributions from several priests of the Diocese of Augsburg. Stadler died before the third volume was finished, leaving the writing of the last two volumes to Rev. J. R. Ginal, pastor of Zusmarshausen.

Other works
Hebrew-Latin lexicon (1831); 
De identitate Sapientiae Veteris Testamenti et Verbi Novi Testamenti, which served as his thesis for the doctorate (1829); 
Dissertatio super Joannem VIII, 25 (Munich, 1832).

References

Sources
 This article cites:
HORMANN in STADLER's Heiligen-Lexikon, III, 6-10; 
SCHMID, Geschichte des Georgianums (Munich, 1894), 306, 309; 
PRANTL, Geschichte der Ludwig-Maximilians-Universitat, II (Munich, 1872), 525.

1804 births
1868 deaths
People from Straubing-Bogen
Christian hagiographers